Sheffield was a borough constituency represented in the House of Commons of the Parliament of the United Kingdom 1832 to 1885. It elected two Members of Parliament (MPs) by the bloc vote system of elections.

The constituency encompassed the urban part of the town and parish (now city) of Sheffield, England, but not the western, rural, parts of Upper Hallam and Ecclesall Bierlow, which were incorporated into Sheffield Town Borough in 1843.

History
Before 1832 Sheffield had been represented by the Yorkshire constituency. The Sheffield Borough constituency was created by the Reform Act of 1832, and was given two MPs, the first time that the town had been represented in the House of Commons. Four candidates stood at the first election contesting these two seats. Voting took place on 13 and 14 December 1832,  with the results declared on 15 December (see below). The election sparked a riot on 14 December, which resulted in the military being called out. The soldiers fired on the crowd, killing six people and injuring several others. Following the Redistribution of Seats Act in 1885, which sought to eliminate constituencies with more than one MP and give greater representation to urban areas, the Borough of Sheffield was sub-divided. The five new divisions—Attercliffe, Brightside, Ecclesall, Hallam, and Sheffield Central—each returned a single MP.

Members of Parliament 
Two MPs were elected at each general election. The table below shows the election years in which one or both of the MPs changed.

The constituency was sub-divided in 1885. The sitting MPs, A. J. Mundella and Charles Stuart-Wortley subsequently stood for and won seats in one of the new constituencies (Sheffield Brightside and Sheffield Hallam respectively).

Election results

Elections in the 1880s

 Caused by Mundella's appointment as Vice-President of the Committee of the Council on Education.

Elections in the 1870s

 Caused by Roebuck's death.

 

 Allott withdrew from the race before polling day.

Elections in the 1860s

Elections in the 1850s

Elections in the 1840s

 Caused by Ward's resignation after being appointed Lord High Commissioner to the Ionian Islands.

Elections in the 1830s

 Caused by Parker's appointment as a Lord Commissioner of the Treasury

References

External links
Wikisource:Report on the Town of Sheffield; with a Description of the Proposed Boundary

Parliamentary constituencies in Sheffield (historic)
Constituencies of the Parliament of the United Kingdom established in 1832
Constituencies of the Parliament of the United Kingdom disestablished in 1885